The 2015 Africa Cup will be the fifteenth edition of the Africa Cup, an annual international rugby union tournament for African nations organised by Rugby Africa.

Changes from last season

Changes from the 2014 Africa Cup:
 All Division 2 tournaments will be held as 15-a-side tournaments
  was promoted to Division 1A
  was relegated to Division 1B
  was added to Division 1C, after serving a suspension from Rugby Africa
  was added to Division 1C, despite missing the 2014 tournament.
  was added to Division 2 South
  was relegated to Division 2

Division 1A

Division 1A will be played during June and July 2015.  The matches will be hosted by each of the Division 1A teams, with the top two ranked teams (Namibia and Zimbabwe hosting two matches each.  The format is a single round robin, home or away format.

The competing teams are:
 
 
 
 

Numbers in parentheses are pre-tournament World Rugby rankings

Match Schedule

Division 1B

Division 1B will be held between 3 and 11 July 2015, in Kampala, Uganda. The competing teams are:

Division 1C
Division 1C will be held between 22 and 27 June 2015, in Lusaka, Zambia.  The competing teams are:
 
 
 
Morocco were originally scheduled to compete, but are not listed on the most recent schedule.
Cameroon apparently withdrew from the tournament.

Division 2

Division 2 is split into regional based tournaments, in the north and south of Africa.

North

The North Group tournament will be held in Ouagadougou, Burkina Faso between 23 and 31 May 2015. The competing teams are:

 
 
 
 
 
 

Match Schedule

South East

The South-East Group tournament will be held in Kinshasa, Democratic Republic of Congo between 25–30 June 2015. The competing teams are:

South
The South Group tournament will be held in Lesotho between 7–13 June 2015.  The competing teams are:

See also
Africa Cup

References

2015
2015 rugby union tournaments for national teams
2015 in African rugby union
June 2015 sports events in Africa
July 2015 sports events in Africa
August 2015 sports events in Africa